The Greenland Abyssal Plain at  is a bathymetric depression in the Greenland Sea. It is delimited by Mohns Ridge and Jan Mayen pressure zone in the South and separated by a smaller ridge to the Boreas Abyssal Plain in the North.

Oceanography
In 1988/89 ocean acoustic tomography was performed there  to study the Greenland Sea gyre and deep water formation. Deep water formation simply means surface water being transported downwards into the ocean, this is important to drive the global ocean currents by thermohaline circulation.
The study showed that the mixed layer at the surface forms in autumn. During winter, the region is covered by sea ice. In early spring when the sea ice vanishes, the layer gets thicker (up to 1.5 km). When the Polar day starts in  late March the seasonal cycle starts again with another shallow mixed layer.

References

External links

Geography of the Arctic
Oceanic basins of the Arctic Ocean
Abyssal plains